Sydney Harry Franz Weale (1881–1943) was a cathedral organist, who served in St Columb's Cathedral, Derry and was borough organist for Stoke on Trent.

Background
He was educated at Ludlow in Shrosphire.

Career

Assistant organist of:
St David's Cathedral 1899 - 1901
Church of St. Mary Magdalene, Newark-on-Trent 1901 - 1903
Southwell Minster 1903 - 1904
St. John's Episcopal Church Perth 1904 - 1909

Organist of:
M.N.C. Church, Mapplewell 1894 - 1895
Westgate Church, Barnsley 1895 - 1898
Conisbrough Parish Church 1898 - 1899
Barony Parish Church, Glasgow 1909 - 1911
St Columb's Cathedral, Derry 1911 - 1913
Bridlington Priory 1914 - 1920
Borough of Stoke on Trent 1920 - 1943

References

1881 births
1943 deaths
Cathedral organists
English classical organists
British male organists
20th-century classical musicians
20th-century British male musicians
Male classical organists